Telsimia ceylonica, is a species of lady beetle found in India and Sri Lanka.

It is a predator of several aphids and scale insects that attack coconut and oil palm.

References 

Coccinellidae
Insects of Sri Lanka
Beetles described in 1866